The Royal Society presents numerous awards, lectures and medals to recognise scientific achievement. The oldest is the Croonian Lecture, created in 1701 at the request of the widow of William Croone, one of the founding members of the Royal Society. The Croonian Lecture is still awarded on an annual basis, and is considered the most important Royal Society prize for the biological sciences. Although the Croonian Lecture was created in 1701, it was first awarded in 1738, seven years after the Copley Medal which is the oldest Royal Society medal still in use and is awarded for "outstanding achievements in research in any branch of science"

Awards

Domestic lectures

International lectures

Medals

Historical awards and lectures

References

British science and technology awards
Royal Society